Australia competed at the 2017 World Championships in Athletics in London, Great Britain, from 4–13 August 2017.

The three time World Championship medallist, Jared Tallent was forced to withdraw from the men's 50 kilometres walk event due to a hamstring injury.

Medalists

Results

Men
Track and road events

Field events

Combined events – Decathlon

Women
Track and road events

Field events

References

2017
Nations at the 2017 World Championships in Athletics
World Championships in Athletics